Joris Dormans is an assistant professor at the Leiden University Centre for the Arts in Society: and author on game development. He is the co-founder of Ludomotion and game design tool Machinations and is best known for his research in procedural content generation, formal tools and methods to design game mechanics.

Education 

Dormans studied at the Faculty of Architecture at University of Eindhoven from 1993 to 1996. He completed his MA studies in Comparative Art Studies at the Free University of Amsterdam from 1997 to 2003. He obtained his PhD in Game Design from the University of Amsterdam in 2012.

Career 
Dormans began his career as a freelancer game designer in 2004. In 2012, he co-founded indie game studio Ludomotion, where to date he serves as Game Director. In 2018, he was one of the co-founders of Machinations, a browser-based platform to simulate game systems.

Selected publications

Published books

References

External links 
 Machinations.io

Dutch video game designers
Living people
Video game researchers
Year of birth missing (living people)